The George Jackson Brigade was a revolutionary group founded in the mid-1970s, based in Seattle, Washington, and named after George Jackson, a dissident prisoner and Black Panther member shot and killed during an alleged escape attempt at San Quentin Prison in 1971.
The group combined veterans of the women's liberation movement, homosexuals and Black prisoners.

The organization was ideologically diverse, consisting of both communists and anarchists. It engaged in a number of bombings and other attacks on governmental and business sites, as well as bank robberies over the years from 1975 through 1977. The group broke up with the death or imprisonment of many of its members by the end of that period.

Formation 
In 1974 Ed Mead traveled to San Francisco, just a few years after his release from prison for a pharmacy burglary, hoping to connect with the Symbionese Liberation Army. However, when he arrived there he joined with another group, the New World Liberation Front or NWLF, where he learned to make pipe bombs.

Upon returning home to Seattle he met with his friend Bruce Seidel. They decided to take up arms for their political beliefs. The two decided to deliver on former Black Panther lieutenant George Jackson's promise and thus the name George Jackson Brigade.

Ideology and Activities 
The George Jackson Brigade included a mixture of Communist and Anarchist ideologies. It was involved in violent acts and advocated the use of force to overthrow the United States government or the government of the State of Washington, trying to initiate a popular insurrection and to draw attention to conditions for prisoners at Walla Walla State Penitentiary and an old federal prison on McNeil Island.

The main goal of the George Jackson Brigade was to replace the capitalist government with a more humane government. The Brigade also sought to redistribute wealth.

The George Jackson Brigade stated that the ruling class would meet any revolution with violence so they must be prepared to use violence themselves. After each attack they carried out, successful or unsuccessful they would send a communique explaining why each place had been attacked. They also used these communiques as a way to communicate with authorities. In its operations, it tried to avoid killing or injuring civilians at all costs. In various communiques, the group claimed credit for bank robberies, bombings, attacks against custom houses, court houses, Safeway stores, public utilities, and correctional facilities.

Their second attack, on the Safeway grocery store on Capitol Hill in Seattle, was also their first failure as a group. The group hid a pipe bomb in a 50-pound bag of dog food, which it left in the store. Ed Mead claimed that he then called the Safeway store and informed them there was a bomb, but his warning was dismissed as a prank, while the Seattle press reported he called the wrong number. The explosion injured a number of civilians, engendering criticism for the attack.

Members 
Prominent members of the George Jackson Brigade included:

Ed Mead – Mead was from California. He was arrested on January 23, 1976, after an attempted bank robbery in Tukwila, Washington. Mead was released from prison in 1993.

John Sherman – Sherman was from New Jersey. He met Mead while they were in federal prison at McNeil Island in the late 1960s. He was injured in the Tukwila bank robbery, then later freed from custody by Mark Cook. Sherman remained free for two years before his recapture. Sherman, who later escaped—again—from a federal prison in California, was finally released in 1998.

Bruce Seidel – Good friend of Mead and graduate student in economics at University of Illinois. He was killed during the Tukwila bank robbery.

Mark Cook – Cook was the organizer of the annual CONvention conference of prison activists. He was the only African-American member of the Brigade and the last to join. He took part in the Tukwila robbery, avoiding arrest, but was later arrested a few days after later freeing Sherman from Harborview Medical Center, wounding a King County Deputy, Virgil Johnson, in the encounter. He spent the next 24 years in prison until 2000.�.

Rita Brown – Working class ex-convict from Southern Oregon active in the Seattle prisoner support community. She was imprisoned for her activities with the Brigade. �

Therese Coupez – Rita Brown's girlfriend from the local area. She also was imprisoned for her activities with the Brigade.

Actions

Downfall 
The downfall of the George Jackson Brigade started on January 23, 1976, when they attempted to rob a bank in Tukwila, Washington. Two police officers and one member of the George Jackson Brigade, Bruce Seidel, were killed along with Sherman and Mead being arrested with Sherman also being wounded. Then, on March 10 of the same year, Mark Cook rescued John Sherman from police custody; however, he shot a police officer in the stomach in the process. Sherman and Cook both escaped but Cook was captured a few days later and spent the next 25 years in prison.

The remaining members retreated to regroup. The group came back in the Fall of 1977, however in September 1977 Brown was arrested while casing a bank. Then on March 21, 1978, Sherman, Coupez, and Brown's girlfriend, Janine Bertram, were arrested in a Tacoma restaurant right before executing another robbery.

According to a report published by the National Consortium for the Study of Terrorism and Responses to Terrorism for the United States Department of Homeland Security's DHS Science and Technology Directorate, the George Jackson Brigade was ranked fifteenth among terrorist groups that perpetrated the most terrorist attacks in the United States between 1970 and 2011.

See also
Angola Three
Black Panther Party
Black Revolutionary Assault Team

References
 What Is the George Jackson Brigade?  George Jackson Brigade Information Project (online)
Mark Cook, Seattle Black Panther Party History and Memory Project University of Washington (website)
Terrorist Incidents Attributed to the George Jackson Brigade in the Global Terrorism Database http://www.start-dev.umd.edu/gtd/search/Results.aspx?chart=overtime&search=George%20Jackson

Sources

Guerrilla USA: The George Jackson Brigade and the Anticapitalist Underground of the 1970s, Burton-Rose, Daniel. University of California Press, 2010. 
Creating a Movement with Teeth: A Documentary History of the George Jackson Brigade, Burton-Rose, Daniel. PM Press, 2010.
https://vault.fbi.gov/George%20Jackson%20Brigade%20

Anarchism in the United States
American bank robbers
Black Power
Anti-imperialist organizations
Far-left politics in the United States
History of Washington (state)
History of Seattle
Left-wing militant groups in the United States
Terrorism in the United States
1975 establishments in Washington (state)
1977 disestablishments in Washington (state)
LGBT socialism
LGBT anarchism